Orville Redenbacher's is an American brand of popcorn made originally by Chester Inc. which was owned by Charles F. Bowman and Orville Redenbacher (who starred in nearly all the commercials until his death in 1995). The product was launched to the public in 1969 and was sold to Hunt-Wesson, a division of Norton Simon Inc. in 1976. In 1983, Esmark purchased Norton Simon, and the next year (1984), Beatrice Foods acquired Esmark. In 1985, Kohlberg Kravis Roberts acquired Beatrice with the goal of selling off businesses.  The popcorn business and other old Hunt-Wesson businesses were sold in 1990 to agribusiness giant Conagra Brands.

See also
 List of popcorn brands

References

External links
Company Website
Chester, Inc.

Conagra Brands brands
Popcorn brands
Products introduced in 1969